General elections were held in Guatemala on 6 March 1966. After no candidate received 50% or more of the national vote, Julio César Méndez Montenegro was elected President by Congress on 5 May. In the Congressional elections, the Revolutionary Party won 28 of the 54 seats. Voter turnout was 56.27% in the presidential election and 55.01% in the Congressional elections. Despite historical odds he faced, left-of-centre Méndez, a former law professor who held the rank of civilian, would be successfully be elected and sworn in as President of Guatemala, which had at this point been long led by military government since its independence in 1847.

Results

President

Congress

References

Bibliography
Guía del organismo legislativo República de Guatemala. Preparada por el Instituto Nacional de Administración para el Desarrollo, Dobierno de la República. 1968. 
Villagrán Kramer, Francisco. Biografía política de Guatemala: años de guerra y años de paz. FLACSO-Guatemala, 2004. 

Elections in Guatemala
Guatemala
1966 in Guatemala
Presidential elections in Guatemala